Zitouna is a district in Skikda Province, Algeria. It is one of the four landlocked districts of this province which lies on the Mediterranean Sea. It was named after its capital, Aïn Kechra.

Municipalities
The district is further divided into two municipalities:
 Zitouna
 Kenoua

Districts of Skikda Province